KELT (102.5 FM) branded as KJ316 is an American commercial radio station licensed in 2010 to serve the community of Encinal, Texas.  The station's broadcast license is held by Randall E. Leyendecker. The station broadcasts Christian contemporary music for the southern rural La Salle and northern Webb counties region. It currently has a construction permit to broadcast at a higher ERP.

References

External links
KJ316 on Facebook

Radio stations established in 2010
ELT